European Prize for Literature (Prix Européen de Littérature) is a European-wide literary award sponsored by the city of Strasbourg with support from the Ministry of Foreign and European Affairs (France). The prize is award by the Jurys des Grands Prix Littéraires, in Strasbourg, at the same time as the Prix de Littérature Francophone Jean Arp and the Prix du Patrimoine Nathan Katz.

The award is presented to an author for their entire body of work, which best represents the cultural dimensions of Europe.

Honorees

References

External links
European Prize for Literature, official website. 

Awards established in 2005
European literary awards
French literary awards
Literary awards honoring writers
2005 establishments in France